Abdullaziz Saeed Al-Dawsari (born 10 July 1987) is a Saudi professional footballer who plays as a winger. He has represented the Saudi Arabia national team in various competitions since 2010. In 2012, Al-Dosari was featured on the cover of the Middle Eastern edition of FIFA 13, alongside Lionel Messi and Joe Hart. 

On 12 June 2022, Al-Dawsari joined First Division side Al-Riyadh.

Career statistics

Club

Honours

Al-Hilal
Saudi Pro League: 2007–08, 2009–10, 2010–11
King Cup: 2015
Crown Prince Cup: 2007–08, 2008–2009, 2009–2010, 2010–11, 2011–12, 2012–13, 2015–16
Super Cup: 2015

Al-Nassr
Super Cup: 2020

References

External links

Al Hilal SFC players
Al-Qadsiah FC players
Al-Faisaly FC players
Al Nassr FC players
Al-Riyadh SC players
People from Dammam
1988 births
Living people
Association football midfielders
Saudi Arabian footballers
Saudi Arabia international footballers
2011 AFC Asian Cup players
Saudi Professional League players